Chelon is a genus of mullets found in coastal marine waters, estuaries and rivers in the Atlantic Ocean and Arabian Sea.

Anatomy 
Chelon possesses the elongated body and dorsal fins typical of the order Mugiliformes, with frontal fins defined by four spines and anal fins with soft rays. The maximum sizes described vary between 15 cm for the Cape Verde mullet and 32 cm for the thicklip grey mullet.

Habitat 
They are catadromous fishes, meaning that they can be found in lagoons and rivers as well as the sea during the reproductive season, fundamentally feeding on algae and diatoms.

Taxonomy
Recent cladistic analysis recovered Chelon as paraphyletic with respect to Liza, so some species of Liza were reassigned to Chelon and Liza synonymized with Chelon.

Species
The following species are classified in the genus Chelon:

 Chelon aurata (A. Risso, 1810) (Golden grey mullet)
 Chelon bandialensis Diouf, 1991 (Diassanga mullet)
 Chelon bispinosus (S. Bowdich, 1825) (Cape Verde mullet)
 Chelon dumerili (Steindachner, 1870) (Grooved mullet)
 Chelon labrosus (A. Risso, 1827) (Thicklip grey mullet)
 Chelon parsia (Hamilton, 1822) (Goldspot mullet)
 Chelon ramada (A. Risso, 1827) (Thinlip grey mullet)
 Chelon richardsonii (A. Smith, 1846) (South African mullet)
 Chelon saliens (A. Risso, 1810) (Leaping mullet)
 Chelon tricuspidens (J. L. B. Smith, 1935) (Striped mullet)

See also
Planiliza

References

 
Mugilidae
Taxa named by Peter Artedi
Marine fish genera